In molecular biology, biochips are engineered substrates ("miniaturized laboratories") that can host large numbers of simultaneous biochemical reactions. One of the goals of biochip technology is to efficiently screen large numbers of biological analytes, with potential applications ranging from disease diagnosis to detection of bioterrorism agents. For example, digital microfluidic biochips are under investigation for applications in biomedical fields. In a digital microfluidic biochip, a group of (adjacent) cells in the microfluidic array can be configured to work as storage, functional operations, as well as for transporting fluid droplets dynamically.

History
The development started with early work on the underlying sensor technology. One of the first portable, chemistry-based sensors was the glass pH electrode, invented in 1922 by Hughes.  The basic concept of using exchange sites to create permselective membranes was used to develop other ion sensors in subsequent years. For example, a K+ sensor was produced by incorporating valinomycin into a thin membrane.

In 1953, Watson and Crick announced their discovery of the now familiar double helix structure of DNA molecules and set the stage for genetics research that continues to the present day. The development of sequencing techniques in 1977 by Gilbert and Sanger (working separately) enabled researchers to directly read the genetic codes that provide instructions for protein synthesis. This research showed how hybridization of complementary single oligonucleotide strands could be used as a basis for DNA sensing. Two additional developments enabled the technology used in modern DNA-based. First, in 1983 Kary Mullis invented the polymerase chain reaction (PCR) technique, a method for amplifying DNA concentrations. This discovery made possible the detection of extremely small quantities of DNA in samples. Secondly in 1986 Hood and co-workers devised a method to label DNA molecules with fluorescent tags instead of radiolabels, thus enabling hybridization experiments to be observed optically.

Figure 1 shows the make up of a typical biochip platform. The actual sensing component (or "chip") is just one piece of a complete analysis system. Transduction must be done to translate the actual sensing event (DNA binding, oxidation/reduction, etc.) into a format understandable by a computer (voltage, light intensity, mass, etc.), which then enables additional analysis and processing to produce a final, human-readable output. The multiple technologies needed to make a successful biochip—from sensing chemistry, to microarraying, to signal processing—require a true multidisciplinary approach, making the barrier to entry steep. One of the first commercial biochips was introduced by Affymetrix. Their "GeneChip" products contain thousands of individual DNA sensors for use in sensing defects, or single nucleotide polymorphisms (SNPs), in genes such as p53 (a tumor suppressor) and BRCA1 and BRCA2 (related to breast cancer). The chips are produced by using microlithography techniques traditionally used to fabricate integrated circuits (see below).

Microarray fabrication

The microarray—the dense, two-dimensional grid of biosensors—is the critical component of a biochip platform. Typically, the sensors are deposited on a flat substrate, which may either be passive (e.g. silicon or glass) or active, the latter
consisting of integrated electronics or micromechanical devices that perform or assist signal transduction. Surface chemistry is used to covalently bind the sensor molecules to the substrate medium. The fabrication of microarrays is non-trivial and is a major economic and technological hurdle that may ultimately decide the success of future biochip platforms. The primary manufacturing challenge is the process of placing each sensor at a specific position (typically on a Cartesian grid) on the substrate. Various means exist to achieve the placement, but typically robotic micro-pipetting or micro-printing systems are used to place tiny spots of sensor material on the chip surface. Because each sensor is unique, only a few spots can be placed at a time. The low-throughput nature of this
process results in high manufacturing costs.

Fodor and colleagues developed a unique fabrication process (later used by Affymetrix) in which a series of microlithography steps is used to combinatorially synthesize hundreds of thousands of unique, single-stranded DNA sensors on a substrate one nucleotide at a time.  One lithography step is needed per base type; thus, a total of four steps is required per nucleotide level. Although this technique is very powerful in that many sensors can be created simultaneously, it is currently only feasible for creating short DNA strands (15–25 nucleotides). Reliability and cost factors limit the number of photolithography steps that can be done. Furthermore, light-directed combinatorial synthesis techniques are not currently possible for proteins or other sensing molecules.

As noted above, most microarrays consist of a Cartesian grid of sensors. This approach is used chiefly to map or "encode" the coordinate of each sensor to its function. Sensors in these arrays typically use a universal signalling technique (e.g. fluorescence), thus making coordinates their only identifying feature. These arrays must be made using a serial process (i.e. requiring multiple, sequential steps) to ensure that each sensor is placed at the correct position.

"Random" fabrication, in which the sensors are placed at arbitrary positions on the chip, is an alternative to the serial method. The tedious and expensive positioning process is
not required, enabling the use of parallelized self-assembly techniques. In this approach, large batches of identical sensors can be produced; sensors from each batch are then combined and assembled into an array. A non-coordinate based encoding scheme must be used to identify each sensor. As the figure shows, such a design was first demonstrated (and later commercialized by Illumina) using functionalized beads placed randomly in the wells of an etched fiber optic cable. Each bead was uniquely encoded with a fluorescent signature. However, this encoding scheme is limited in the number of unique dye combinations that can be used and successfully differentiated.

Protein biochip array and other microarray technologies
Microarrays are not limited to DNA analysis; protein microarrays, antibody microarray, chemical compound microarray can also be produced using biochips.  Randox Laboratories Ltd. launched Evidence, the first protein Biochip Array Technology analyzer in 2003.  In protein Biochip Array Technology, the biochip replaces the ELISA plate or cuvette as the reaction platform.  The biochip is used to simultaneously analyze a panel of related tests in a single sample, producing a patient profile.  The patient profile can be used in disease screening, diagnosis, monitoring disease progression or monitoring treatment.  Performing multiple analyses simultaneously, described as multiplexing, allows a significant reduction in processing time and the amount of patient sample required.  Biochip Array Technology is a novel application of a familiar methodology, using sandwich, competitive and antibody-capture immunoassays. The difference from conventional immunoassays is that, the capture ligands are covalently attached to the surface of the biochip in an ordered array rather than in solution.

In sandwich assays an enzyme-labelled antibody is used; in competitive assays an enzyme-labelled antigen is used.  On antibody-antigen binding a chemiluminescence reaction produces light.  Detection is by a charge-coupled device (CCD) camera.  The CCD camera is a sensitive and high-resolution sensor able to accurately detect and quantify very low levels of light.  The test regions are located using a grid pattern then the chemiluminescence signals are analysed by imaging software to rapidly and simultaneously quantify the individual analytes.

Biochips are also used in the field of microphysiometry e.g. in skin-on-a-chip applications.

For details about other array technologies, see Antibody microarray.

See also

 Chemical compound microarray
 DNA microarray
 Lab-on-a-chip
 Magnetic immunoassay
 Microphysiometry
 Nanosensors
 Organ-on-a-chip
 Planar Patch Clamp
 Protein array
 Sequencing
 Single nucleotide polymorphism
 Tissue microarray

References

Bioinformatics
Biotechnology
Molecular biology
Genomics
Proteomics
Microarrays